Andrew Henry Hilaire (February 1, 1899 – August 3, 1935) was an American jazz drummer active from the 1910s to early-1930s.

Early life 
Hilaire was born in New Orleans of a middle-class, Creole of color family that lived in the French Quarter. His family moved to Chicago in the 1910s. By 1917, he was touring Vaudeville with the Tennessee Ten jazz band, fronted by Florence Mills.

Career 
Hilaire was active in Chicago's "Roaring Twenties" music scene, playing with the bands of Lil Hardin Armstrong and Carroll Dickerson before eight years with Doc Cook. He took part in various recording sessions during his time with the Doc Cook Orchestra, including with Freddie Keppard and as a member of Jelly Roll Morton's Red Hot Peppers.

In the 1930s, he played with Jerome Don Pasquall and Eddie South in addition to leading his own band.

Personal life 
During his life, Hilaire had trouble breathing due to either asthma or tuberculosis. He died at home in Chicago at the age of 36.

References 

1899 births
1935 deaths
American jazz drummers
Louisiana Creole people
Jazz musicians from New Orleans
20th-century American drummers
American male drummers
20th-century American male musicians
American male jazz musicians
Red Hot Peppers members
Deaths from asthma
20th-century deaths from tuberculosis
Tuberculosis deaths in Illinois